Come See Me may refer to:
Come See Me (festival), Rock Hill, South Carolina, U.S.
"Come See Me" (Pretty Things song), 1966
"Come See Me" (112 song), 1996
"Come See Me", a 2006 song by Pitbull from his album El Mariel